The Last Days of Pompeii is an Italian-American 1984 television miniseries filmed at Pinewood Studios and broadcast on ABC-TV and Rai, adapting the 1834 novel of the same name by Edward Bulwer-Lytton. It was the second English-language adaptation of the book for film or television (previously adapted mainly in Italian; the 1935 RKO film was unrelated to the novel and the 1900 adaptation by Walter R. Booth, while the first cinematic adaptation in English was a short film).

On June 5, 2012, Sony released the mini-series on DVD.

Cast

References

External links
 
 
 

Films based on The Last Days of Pompeii
Pompeii in popular culture
1980s American television miniseries
Television shows based on British novels
Television dramas set in ancient Rome
Television series produced at Pinewood Studios
Films directed by Peter R. Hunt
Television series set in the Roman Empire
Works set in the 1st century